Et godt stup i et grunt vann (translation A Good Plunge Into a Shallow Water) is the fourth studio album by the Norwegian rapper Cezinando. It was released on February 21, 2020, through 1111klubb and distributed by Universal Music. The album follows the third studio album Noen ganger og andre (2017). Production was handled by Aksel "Axxe" Carlson, Ole Torjus Hofvind, and Eivind Helgerød.

Background 
The studio album was released on February 21, 2020, through 1111klubb and distributed by Universal Music. The title of the album is explained as a monostich poem by Cezinando. At the Norwegian radioshow, Nitimen, on NRK Cezinando explained when that the poem was something that got "stuck to his head" when he and Ole Torjus Hofvind was out for a walk after a long studio session.

Critical reception 

Et godt stup i et grunt vann received widespread acclaim from music critics.

Tracklist 
Credits adapted from the album's liner notes on Tidal.

Personnel 
Credits adapted from Tidal.

Musicians 

 Cezinando – lead vocals , programming 
 Jakob Eri Myhre –  trumpet 
 Andreas Rotevatn –  trombone 
 Einar Stray –  piano 
 Thomas Kongshavn –  guitar 
 Ole Torjus Hofvind –  keyboards , programming 
 Eivind Helgerød –  keyboards , programming 
 Aksel "Axxe" Carlson –  keyboards , programming

Technical 

 George Tanderø – mastering 
 Simon Dolmen Bergseth – mixing 
 Ole Torjus Hofvind – recording 
 Aksel "Axxe" Carlson – recording 
 Eivind Helgerød– recording

Management and marketing 

 Cezinando – executive production
 Little Big Sister – project support and coordination

Charts

Release history

References

External links

2020 albums